Tanya Dooley (born May 8, 1972) is an American sprinter. At the 1995 IAAF World Indoor Championships, she won third place in the  relay, along with her teammates Flirtisha Harris, Nelrae Pasha, and Kim Graham. Dooley also competed in the  relay at the 1991 Pan American Junior Athletics Championships, in which her team earned second place.

References 

 

American female sprinters
World Athletics Indoor Championships medalists
1972 births
Living people
21st-century American women
20th-century American women